The Powerpuff Girls: Bad Mojo Jojo is a 2000 2D platform game developed by Sennari Interactive and published by Bay Area Multimedia for the Game Boy Color. It is based on the Powerpuff Girls, a cartoon series on Cartoon Network. 

Bad Mojo Jojo is the first game of a three-game series, which includes The Powerpuff Girls: Paint the Townsville Green and The Powerpuff Girls: Battle HIM. Players can trade character cards across versions when linked together with the Game Boy Color's Game Link Cable accessory.

Gameplay
The Powerpuff Girls: Bad Mojo Jojo follows Blossom, the leader of the Powerpuff Girls, as she fights Mojo Jojo and his henchmen. Blossom can fly, but only for a short period of time. GameSpot cites this as a key problem, as whenever Blossom falls into water, she not only dies, but any progress in collecting required trinkets throughout the level is reset to nothing.

Reception
The game was a failure critically. IGN gave the game a 5.0, and wrote that, "It really boils down to a game where you fly around and collect icons thrown in different parts of the levels." GameSpot rated the game a 3.2 ("bad" rating), and reported, "Even younger players will find the game to be little more than an exercise in frustration."

References

2000 video games
Game Boy Color games
Game Boy Color-only games
The Powerpuff Girls video games
Video games developed in the United States
Cartoon Network video games